Elections were held in Eastern Visayas for seats in the House of Representatives of the Philippines on May 10, 2010.

The candidate with the most votes won that district's seat for the 15th Congress of the Philippines.

Summary

Biliran

The result of the election is under protest in the House of Representatives Electoral Tribunal.

Eastern Samar

Teodulo Coquilla is the incumbent, but his party Lakas-Kampi-CMD did not nominate anybody in this district. He is running as an independent.

Leyte

1st District
Ferdinand Martin Romualdez is the incumbent.

2nd District
Incumbent Trinidad Apostol is in her third consecutive term already and is ineligible for reelection. Her husband Sergio is her party's nominee for the district's seat.

3rd District
Andres Salvacion, Jr. is the incumbent.

4th District
Eufrocino Codilla, Sr. is in his third consecutive term already and is ineligible for reelection. His son Eufrocino Jr. will run in his place. Actor Richard Gomez was disqualified when the Commission on Elections granted the petition of disqualification filed by Buenaventura Juntilla against Gomez. Gomez was replaced by his wife, TV host Lucy Torres-Gomez. The name of Richard Gomez will remain in the ballot and will go to Lucy Torres-Gomez.

Codilla placed the result of the election under protest in the House of Representatives Electoral Tribunal. The tribunal ruled on May 25, 2012 that Lucy Torrez-Gomez's substitution of her husband was legal, thereby acknowledging votes for her as valid and not stray. On March 19, 2013, or three months before Torres-Gomez's term was to end, the Supreme Court granted the petition of Silverio Tagolino, who argued that since Gomez was disqualified in the first place, his substitute cannot be allowed to run; the decision, which had 7 justices concurring, 4 dissenting and 4 abstaining, effectively removed Torres-Gomez from her post. Torres-Gomez is appealing the case.

5th District
Incumbent Carmen Cari is in third consecutive term already and is ineligible for reelection. Her son Baybay mayor Jose Carlos is her party's nominee for the district's seat and is running unopposed.

Northern Samar

1st District
Incumbent Paul Daza is running as governor of Northern Samar; his father provincial governor Raul is his party's nominee for the district's seat.

2nd District
Emil Ong is the incumbent.

The result of the election is under protest in the House of Representatives Electoral Tribunal.

Samar (Western Samar)

1st District
Reynaldo Uy is in his third consecutive term already and is ineligible for reelection. His party nominated Calbayog mayor Mel Senen Sarmiento as their nominee for the district's seat.

2nd District
Incumbent Sharee Ann Tan will run for governor of Samar. Her mother, governor Milagrosa is her party's nominee for the district's seat.

The result of the election is under protest in the House of Representatives Electoral Tribunal.

Southern Leyte

Roger Mercado is the incumbent.

References

External links
Official website of the Commission on Elections

2010 Philippine general election
2010